Beringraja is a genus of skates in the family Rajidae with up to six described species. Formerly, they were included in the genus Raja until 2012, when the genus Beringraja was erected for the two species which had multiple embryos per egg capsule. Genetic evidence has led to four additional species being proposed for inclusion in the genus, although this issue has not be completely resolved. These large skates are found in the North Pacific.

Species
Up to six species are in the genus:

 Big skate (B. binoculata) 
 Cortez' ray (B. cortezensis) 
 California ray (B. inornata) 
 Longnose skate (B. rhina) 
 Mottled skate (B. pulchra) 
 Starry skate (B. stellulata)

References 

Rajidae
Ray genera